Paraflabellula is a genus of Amoebozoa.

References

Amoebozoa genera